Baratranthus is a genus of flowering plants belonging to the family Loranthaceae.

Its native range is Sri Lanka, Indo-China to Malesia.

Species:

Baratranthus axanthus 
Baratranthus nodiflorus 
Baratranthus productus

References

Loranthaceae
Loranthaceae genera